Lincicochylis is a genus of moths belonging to the family Tortricidae.

Species
Lincicochylis argentifusa (Walsingham, 1914)

See also
List of Tortricidae genera

References

 , 1986. Acta zool. cracov. 29 (16) : 384.
 , 2011: Diagnoses and remarks on genera of Tortricidae, 2: Cochylini (Lepidoptera: Tortricidae). Shilap Revista de Lepidopterologia 39 (156): 397–414.

External links
tortricidae.com

Cochylini
Tortricidae genera